Bothriocyrtum is a genus of mygalomorph spiders in the family Halonoproctidae, first described by Eugène Simon in 1891. They are native to Mexico, Taiwan, and the southern United States. It was separated from Cyrtocarenum in 1891 for several reasons, including an increased width of separation and a distinctly different arrangement of the eyes.  it contains only three species: B. californicum, B. fabrile, and B. tractabile.

References

External links
Bothriocyrtum at BugGuide

Halonoproctidae
Mygalomorphae genera
Taxa named by Eugène Simon